In enzymology, a diguanidinobutanase is an enzyme that catalyzes the chemical reaction

1,4-diguanidinobutane + H2O  agmatine + urea

Thus, the two substrates of this enzyme are 1,4-diguanidinobutane and H2O, whereas its two products are agmatine and urea.

This enzyme belongs to the family of hydrolases, those acting on carbon-nitrogen bonds other than peptide bonds, specifically in linear amidines.  The systematic name of this enzyme class is 1,4-diguanidinobutane amidinohydrolase.

References

 

EC 3.5.3
Enzymes of unknown structure